Hugh Miller FRSE FGS (1850–1896) was a Scottish geologist, son of his more famous father, the geologist and folklorist Hugh Miller.

Life

He was born on 15 July 1850 in Leith, the youngest of four children of Hugh Miller and his wife, Lydia Fraser. He was baptised at South Leith Parish Church in October 1850. The family lived at 2 Stuart Street at Jock's Lodge in Edinburgh. His father shot himself at their later home on Tower Street in Portobello in 1856.

Miller attended Edinburgh Academy for one year (1859/60), then moved to the High School, then again to the Edinburgh Institution. He finally left Edinburgh to attend the Green Row Academy in Silloth. He then studied Geology at the Royal School of Mines in London (1869-1972).

In 1874 Miller joined the British Geological Survey. He worked in Northumberland, Cromarty and Sutherlandshire. In 1886 he was elected a Fellow of the Royal Society of Edinburgh. His proposers were James Geikie, Robert Gray, Ramsay Heatley Traquair and  Ben Peach.

Miller lived at 3 Douglas Crescent in Edinburgh's West End, a terraced townhouse facing the Water of Leith. He died on 9 January 1896. He is buried next to his father in the north-west corner of Grange Cemetery in south Edinburgh.

Family

In 1878 Miller married Mrs Jane Morison Campbell, a widow.

Publications

Landscape Geology (1884)
Boulder Glaciation (1884)
Otterburn and Elsdon (1887)
Plashetts and Kielder (1889)

Notes

References

1850 births
1896 deaths
Scottish geologists
Fellows of the Royal Society of Edinburgh
People from Leith
People educated at Edinburgh Academy
People educated at the Royal High School, Edinburgh
People educated at Stewart's Melville College
Burials at the Grange Cemetery
Alumni of Imperial College London